Venefica multiporosa is an eel in the family Nettastomatidae (duckbill/witch eels). It was described by Christine Karrer in 1983. It is a marine, deep water-dwelling eel which is known from the Indo-western Pacific, including Madagascar, Australia and the Philippines.

References

Nettastomatidae
Taxa named by Christine Karrer
Fish described in 1983